Cherry Orchard Football Club is an Irish association football club based in the Cherry Orchard district of Ballyfermot, Dublin. Their senior team plays in the Leinster Senior League. They have also competed in the FAI Cup, the FAI Intermediate Cup, the FAI Junior Cup and the Leinster Senior Cup. The Orchard also have reserve teams playing in the Leinster Senior League and enter teams in the Dublin & District Schoolboy League. Cherry Orchard is well known for its youth system which has successfully produced dozens of players who have gone onto play for clubs throughout Ireland and the United Kingdom. In addition, many have also gone on to represent the Republic of Ireland at various international levels.

History

Senior Teams
When Cherry Orchard was formed in 1957 it initially only organised adult teams. They began playing in the Leinster Alliance League and then the Leinster Junior League before switching to the Athletic Union League in the mid-1960s. Orchard first came to national prominence when they won the FAI Junior Cup in 1981–82. Between 1984 and 1985 and 1986–87 they also won the FAI Junior Cup three times in a row and then won it twice in a row in 1989–90 and 1990–91. During this time Orchard also won the Athletic Union League five times. Based on these successes, the club decided to join the Leinster Senior League for the 1992–93 season. In their first season in the Leinster Senior League, Orchard gained promotion to the Senior Division. In 1993–94, in their debut season in the Senior Division, Orchard won their first Leinster Senior League title. In the 2015–16 season, 'The Orchard' won the Leinster Senior League Senior 1 Sunday Division and the Charlie Cahill Cup double.  They also finished runners-up in the Leinster Senior League Major Saturday Division.

Youth Academy
Cherry Orchard first began to field schoolboy teams in 1970. In the decades since, Orchard have won an assortment of schoolboy and youth league and cup competitions at both provincial and national level. In 1993 Cherry Orchard also won the prestigious Milk Cup, beating Rangers F.C. 4–2 on penalties after a 1–1 draw in the final played before a crowd of 10,000 at the Coleraine Showgrounds. All the previous winners of the Milk Cup had been academy teams of top clubs from England and Scotland. Cherry Orchard regularly supplies players to Republic of Ireland schoolboy and youth teams. In 1998 when the Republic of Ireland won both the UEFA European Under-16 Championship and the UEFA European Under-18 Championship both teams included former Orchard players. Andy Reid played in the Under-16 team, while Alan Quinn scored in the Under-18 final against Germany.

Grounds
Cherry Orchard play their home games at Elmdale, the Lawns (Le Fanu Park) and at St. John’s College in Ballyfermot. The facility in Elmdale has been transformed in recent years with the addition of an AstroTurf.

Notable former players
Republic of Ireland internationals

Republic of Ireland women internationals
 Jessica Stapleton
League of Ireland XI representatives
 Jackie Jameson
 Conor Kenna
 Aidan Price
Republic of Ireland B internationals
 Seán Dillon
 Paddy McCarthy
 Ger O'Brien
 Tony Scully
Republic of Ireland U23 international
 Brendan Clarke
 Conor Kenna
 Ger O'Brien
Republic of Ireland U21 internationals

Republic of Ireland U19 internationals

Republic of Ireland U17 internationals
 Gary Dempsey
 David Freeman
 Darragh Markey
Republic of Ireland U16 international
 Barry Prenderville
 Ben Quinn
 James Abankwah
 Thomas Lonergan
 Glory Nzingo
Republic of Ireland U16 international
 Ben Quinn
 James Abankwah
 Craig King
 Glory Nzingo
Republic of Ireland futsal international
 Dane Massey
Ireland national Australian rules football team player
 Paul Sharry

Honours

Senior Team
Leinster Senior League
Winners: 1993–94, 1994–95, 1996–97, 2000–01, 2001–02, 2006–07: 6
Runners-up: 1995–96, 1998–99, 2012–13: 3
Athletic Union League
Winners: 1981–82, 1984–85, 1987–88, 1989–90, 1991–92: 5
FAI Intermediate Cup
Winners: 1997–98
Runners-up: 2001–02, 2010–11, 2011–12: 3
FAI Junior Cup
Winners: 1981–82, 1984–85, 1985–86, 1986–87, 1989–90, 1990–91, 1994–95: 7
Runners-up: 1977–78: 1
Leinster Senior Cup
Runners-up: 1997–98: 1

Youth Team
FAI Youth Cup
Winners: 1989–90, 1992–93: 2
FAI Under-17 Cup
Winners: 1988–89, 1992–93, 1993–94, 1994–95, 1996–97, 1998–99, 2002–03, 2013–14: 8
Runners-up: 2012–13: 1
 Milk Cup
Winners: 1992–93: 1

References

External links
  Cherry Orchard on Facebook 
  
Leinster Senior League (association football) clubs
Association football clubs established in 1957
1957 establishments in Ireland
Association football clubs in Dublin (city)
Former Athletic Union League (Dublin) clubs
Association football academies in the Republic of Ireland